Shingo Hayashi (林 伸伍, born 25 January, 1985) is a Japanese dressage rider. Shingo competed at the 2010 Asian Games in Hangzhou, China and at the 2014 Asian Games in Incheon, South Korea where he won team silver. He also competed at the 2018 FEI World Equestrian Games in Tryon, North Carolina, United States of America. He was the first team reserve for the Japanese dressage team during the 2016 Summer Olympics.

Hayashi competed at the 2020 Olympic Games in Tokyo, representing the Japanese team. He finished 48th in the individual competition.

References 

Living people
1985 births
Japanese male equestrians
Japanese dressage riders
Asian Games silver medalists for Japan
Asian Games medalists in equestrian
Equestrians at the 2010 Asian Games
Equestrians at the 2014 Asian Games
Equestrians at the 2020 Summer Olympics
Olympic equestrians of Japan
Medalists at the 2014 Asian Games